Magic Potion is the fourth studio album by American rock duo the Black Keys. It was released in 2006 and was their first record released on Nonesuch Records, the band's current label. This album marks the first time they wrote and composed entirely original material, unlike on previous albums and EPs.

Like the group's first two albums, Magic Potion was recorded in the basement of drummer Patrick Carney; in his estimation, the record was made using "$5,000 worth of crappy equipment". The group's guitarist Dan Auerbach explained the decision behind the recording location:

Carney expressed disappointment in the quality of the finished record:

Track listing

Cover art
The cover art depicts a Fabergé egg. Inside the album is a picture of a fried egg. The back cover depicts a falcon.

Personnel
Dan Auerbach – guitar, 12 string guitar, slide guitar, lap steel, vocals
Patrick Carney – drums, percussion

References

2006 albums
The Black Keys albums
Nonesuch Records albums
Albums produced by Dan Auerbach
Albums produced by Patrick Carney